Kundanahalli  is a village in the southern state of Karnataka, India. The village has a close proximity to Makavalli, which hosts ICL Sugar Industry.

See also
 Mandya
 Districts of Karnataka

References

External links
 http://Mandya.nic.in/

Villages in Mandya district